Henrik Jahre (born 21 April 1937) is a Norwegian politician for the Conservative Party.

He served as a deputy representative to the Norwegian Parliament from Vestfold during the terms 1973–1977 and 1977–1981. In total he met during 5 days of parliamentary session.

References

1937 births
Living people
Conservative Party (Norway) politicians
Deputy members of the Storting
Vestfold politicians
Place of birth missing (living people)
20th-century Norwegian politicians